Astra 1B was the second of the Astra communications satellites launched and operated by SES (Société Européenne des Satellites) to add extra capacity to the satellite television (direct broadcasting) services from 19.2° East, serving Germany, the United Kingdom and Ireland.

Satcom K3 
SES bought the satellite in 1989 from failed direct broadcast satellite (DBS) company Crimson Satellite Associates while still under construction by GE Astro Space (as Satcom K3). Twelve years later, in 2001, SES acquired GE Americom, which originally was to operate the Satcom K3 satellite (and was itself the result of General Electric's purchase of RCA Corporation in 1986) and renamed it "SES Americom". It was merged with SES New Skies to form SES World Skies before the company was merged into its parent company, SES S.A. in 2011.

Mission 
On 4 June 1991, Astra 1B suffered an attitude control failure, causing minor drift in north–south direction, meaning that it became difficult to obtain a steady lock on the satellite. This was most notable on analogue transmissions where the picture would move from clear to carrying sparklies and back again. The failure was likely caused by recent solar winds which impacted the electronics on both the primary and the backup momentum wheels. In September 1991, SES dealt with the failure by permanently deactivating the automatic control mode for the attitude subsystem.

Along with Astra 1C, Astra 1B was to be replaced in 2002 with Astra 1K, which failed to launch successfully, and as a result it continued to serve a longer life than expected, only falling from use when digital television on Astra 2A removed the majority of United Kingdom and Ireland targeted channels from 19.2° East. From 2005, SES claimed that the satellite was in use for VSAT services, however no transponders were powered, and the satellite drifted to around 19.5° East. One transponder was reactivated in October 2005, but was carrying only colour bars.

Decommissioning 
On 16 June 2006, SES confirmed that Astra 1B would be decommissioned and de-orbited within weeks after Astra 1KR, the satellite which would replace Astra 1B and 1C, reached the operational orbital position of 19.2° East. It was officially end-of-lifed on 14 July 2006; close to four years after it had ceased carrying signals, ending SES's claims that the craft was operational.

Transponders 
Astra 1B transponders were used in the following ways during the operational life of the satellite:

See also 

 SES satellite operator
 Astra satellite family
 Astra 19.2°E
 Astra 1A
 Astra 1C
 Astra 1D
 Astra 1E
 Astra 1K
 Astra 1KR

References 

Astra satellites
Derelict satellites orbiting Earth
1991 in Luxembourg
Satellites of Luxembourg
Spacecraft launched in 1991